Captain William Glyn Jenkins  (28 March 1925 – 24 October 2002) was a Royal Marines officer and academic. He was the youngest Royal Marine to win the Distinguished Service Order in the Second World War, and later became senior lecturer in international affairs at the Royal Military Academy Sandhurst.

Early life
Jenkins was born at Morpeth in Northumberland. He was educated at Blundell's School in Tiverton, where he won a bursary, and, in October 1942, he gained a Macbride Open Scholarship to Hertford College, Oxford, to read geography.

Jenkins cut short his studies after a year and applied to join the Royal Navy; but he failed his medical because of slight colour-blindness and joined the Royal Marines in August 1943. After passing through Officer Cadet Training Unit, he was commissioned early in 1944 and posted to the Commando Basic Training Centre at Achnacarry, north of Fort William in the Highlands.

Second World War
After gaining his green beret, Jenkins was posted to Vis, off the Dalmatian coast, the only Yugoslav island in Allied hands. No. 43 (Royal Marine) Commando were supporting Tito's partisans and, as a subaltern with "E" Troop, he took part in a number of raids on the German garrisons of the other islands.

In October 1944, 43 Commando disembarked at Gruz Harbour, near Dubrovnik, as part of "Floydforce" and Jenkins's troop was deployed inland to harry the retreating Germans. One of its more unusual tasks was to get supplies by mule to an isolated patrol of the Long Range Desert Group.

Distinguished Service Order
43 Commando went to Italy in January 1945 and, two months later, as part of the last major offensive of the Italian campaign, it moved up to its new front on the river Reno, north of Ravenna. In the first few days of April, as part of 2nd Commando Brigade, it launched "Operation Roast", a curtain-raiser for the Eighth Army's spring offensive (in which the British 78th Infantry Division, supported by armour, attacked towards Argenta from the east, while, to the west of the town, 10th Indian Division was poised for a thrust north of Bologna).

As reported in Jenkins' obituary: 

He was awarded the Distinguished Service Order for his actions.

Post war
The Germans surrendered northern Italy on 2 May 1945 and 43 Commando was disbanded soon afterwards. Jenkins was posted to Hong Kong to join 42 Commando and, after promotion to captain, he took command of "W" Troop.

Jenkins was demobilised in 1946 and returned to Oxford to complete his degree. He won a Blue for swimming and captained his college rugby XV before going to Yale for a year on a Henry Fellowship. He taught for six years at Christ's Hospital in Horsham, with a break for a year at Hilton College in Natal. In 1956, he became a senior lecturer in international affairs at the Royal Military Academy Sandhurst.

Sources
Extracted from the Obituary of Captain Bill Jenkins, The Daily Telegraph, 27 December 2002.
Obituary of Captain William Jenkins, The Times, 14 November 2002.
Commando Subaltern at War: Royal Marine Operations in Yugoslavia and Italy, 1944–1945; W.G. Jenkins; Greenhill Books, 1996. ; 
Royal Marine Officers 1939−1945

1925 births
2002 deaths
People educated at Blundell's School
Alumni of Hertford College, Oxford
Royal Marines Commando officers
Royal Marines personnel of World War II
Companions of the Distinguished Service Order
Military personnel from Northumberland
Academics of the Royal Military Academy Sandhurst